Oluseyi Petinrin (born 19 January 1955) is a retired air chief marshal in the Nigerian Air Force, who was Chief of the Defence Staff of Nigeria from 2010 to 2012. Prior to his appointment as Chief of Defence Staff, he had held the position of Chief of Air Staff.

Early life
Petinrin attended the Federal Government College, Sokoto.

References

 

 

1955 births
Nigerian Air Force air marshals
Living people
Yoruba military personnel
Nigerian Defence Academy alumni